Alex "Popeye" Allen was an American baseball left fielder in the Negro leagues. He played with the New York Black Yankees in 1943.

References

External links
 and  Seamheads 

New York Black Yankees players
Year of birth missing
Year of death missing
Baseball outfielders